Shahdeen Malik is a Bangladeshi lawyer, eminent jurist, a constitutional expert, and legal activist.

Early life 
Malik's father, Abdul Malik Chowdhury, was the chief conservatory officer of the Forest Department. He did his masters in law at the Patrice Lumumba University in Russia in 1979. He did another masters in law at the University of Pennsylvania Law School in 1984. He did his PhD at the School of Oriental and African Studies in 1994.

Career 
Malik joined the University of Dhaka in 1980 as a lecturer.

Malik joined Bangladesh Legal Aid and Services Trust in 1990. He wrote Public Interest Litigation in South Asia - Rights in Search of Remedies in 1997.

Malik started his practice at the Bangladesh Supreme Court in 2003.

Malik was a founder director and faculty at the law school of BRAC University.

In 2008, Malik was the lawyer for the University of Dhaka.

From 2010 to 2019, Malik served at the Bangladesh Institute of Law and International Affairs as an honorary director. He criticised the Fifteen Amendment to the Constitution of Bangladesh which abolished the caretaker government on 19 July after praising it on 10 July 2011. In 2013, he was the lawyer of the Bangladesh Election Commission.

Malik is a Trustee board member of the Centre for Policy Dialogue. He is a member of the governing body of the ActionAid Bangladesh, and the Refugee and Migratory Movement Research Unit. He is an Independent director of Pubali Bank Limited. He is an Adjunct Professor at Gono University.

In February 2022, Malik withdrew his name from consideration for the next election commissioner of Bangladesh. He described the speech by the Minister of Law, Anisul Huq, in Geneva defending the human rights record of the government as embarrassing.

References 

Living people
Year of birth missing (living people)
University of Pennsylvania Law School alumni
Peoples' Friendship University of Russia alumni
Academic staff of the University of Dhaka
Academic staff of BRAC University
Academic staff of Gono University